Illimar is an Estonian masculine given name. Notable people with the name include:
Illimar Pärn (born 1988), ski jumper
Illimar Truverk (born 1967), architect

References

Estonian masculine given names